Clayton Grant Mortensen (born April 10, 1985) is an American former professional baseball pitcher and current coach. He played in Major League Baseball for the St. Louis Cardinals, Oakland Athletics, Colorado Rockies, and Boston Red Sox.

Amateur career
After graduating from Madison High School, Mortensen went to Treasure Valley Community College, then Gonzaga University. He played college baseball for the Bulldogs from 2006–2007.

Professional career

St. Louis Cardinals
Mortensen was drafted by the St. Louis Cardinals 36th overall in the 2007 Major League Baseball Draft.

He was invited to spring training , but began the season in the minors. He was called up to the major leagues for the first time on June 29, .

Oakland Athletics
On July 24, 2009, Mortensen was traded to the Oakland Athletics along with Brett Wallace and Shane Peterson for Matt Holliday. He was called up to the Athletics to replace Russ Springer on August 8.

Colorado Rockies
Mortensen was designated for assignment in January 2011 and was eventually traded to the Colorado Rockies for minor league pitcher Ethan Hollingsworth.

Boston Red Sox
On January 21, 2012 Mortensen was traded to the Boston Red Sox for Marco Scutaro. 
Mortensen made his Red Sox debut on May 2, 2012 throwing three innings and giving up just one hit. On July 7, Mortensen was called up to the majors to be the 26th man for the Red Sox and Yankees double-header. Mortenson was recalled on August 8, when Vincente Padilla was placed on the disabled list.

Mortensen was designated for assignment by the Red Sox on June 29, 2013. After clearing waivers, Mortensen was assigned outright to the Pawtucket Red Sox on July 3.

Kansas City Royals
On August 27, 2013, the Red Sox traded Mortensen to the Kansas City Royals for Quintin Berry.

Miami Marlins
Mortensen signed a minor league contract with the Miami Marlins on April 4, 2017, and was assigned to the Triple-A New Orleans Baby Cakes. He elected free agency on November 6, 2017.

Kansas City Royals
On January 20, 2018, Mortensen signed a minor league deal with the Kansas City Royals. Mortensen did not throw a pitch in 2018. He elected free agency on November 2, 2018.

Coaching career
Mortensen retired after the 2018 season and was named as the Pitching Coach for the Idaho Falls Chukars for the 2019 season. He was named the Myrtle Beach Pelicans pitching coach for the 2021 season.

Pitching style
Mortensen threw four pitches: a four-seam fastball and two-seam fastball at 88–90 mph, a slider at 85–87, and a circle changeup at 79–81. The slider tended to be used more against right-handed batters, and the changeup was used more against left-handed hitters. Mortensen's slider had a somewhat unusual and unpredictable movement:My slider isn’t a typical slider. It doesn’t necessarily break right-to-left. It has more depth to it, so it’s more of a down-ball. It also has three different movements, depending on where my release point is. When I really accentuate staying on top of it — away to a righty — it will have a little depth and a little right-to-left movement. If I try to throw it down the middle, it’s more straight down. Sometimes it kind of screws. It's basically because of the way I grip it. I kind of cock my wrist a little bit. To be honest, I try to throw it as hard as I can and it just kind of does what it wants to do.

Personal life
On the night of October 2, 2009, Mortensen was arrested on suspicion of drunken driving and spent the night in the Santa Clara County jail.

Mortensen is married to Janna and they had two children, Miles and Harper. Miles died at the age of 6 on September 11, 2018 after a long battle with stage IV Neuroblastoma.

References

External links

1985 births
Living people
People from Rexburg, Idaho
Baseball coaches from Idaho
Baseball players from Idaho
Major League Baseball pitchers
St. Louis Cardinals players
Oakland Athletics players
Colorado Rockies players
Boston Red Sox players
Batavia Muckdogs players
Treasure Valley Chukars baseball players
Swing of the Quad Cities players
Memphis Redbirds players
Springfield Cardinals players
Sacramento River Cats players
Colorado Springs Sky Sox players
Gonzaga Bulldogs baseball players
Pawtucket Red Sox players
Portland Sea Dogs players
Omaha Storm Chasers players
Jacksonville Jumbo Shrimp players
New Orleans Baby Cakes players
Navegantes del Magallanes players
American expatriate baseball players in Venezuela
Minor league baseball coaches